Kosmos 2397 ( meaning Cosmos 2397) is a Russian US-KMO missile early warning satellite which was launched in 2003 as part of the Russian Space Forces' Oko programme. The satellite is designed to identify missile launches using infrared telescopes.

Kosmos 2397 was launched from Site 81/24 at Baikonur Cosmodrome in Kazakhstan. A Proton-K carrier rocket with a DM-2 upper stage was used to perform the launch, which took place at 04:23 UTC on 24 April 2003. The launch successfully placed the satellite into geostationary orbit. It subsequently received its Kosmos designation, and the international designator 2003-015A. The United States Space Command assigned it the Satellite Catalog Number 27775.

The satellite developed problems two months after being launched. It started drifting eastwards in June 2003 and had reached 155E by November 2003.

See also

List of Kosmos satellites (2251–2500)

References

External links
Video of Kosmos 2397 tumbling in space, shot in 2009

Spacecraft launched in 2003
Spacecraft launched by Proton rockets
Kosmos satellites
Oko